The 2004 Super League Grand Final was the 7th official Grand Final and conclusive and championship-deciding game of Super League IX. It was held on Saturday 16 October 2004, at Old Trafford, Manchester, and was played between Leeds Rhinos, who finished top of the league after the 28 weekly rounds, and Bradford Bulls, who finished second after the weekly rounds.

Background

Route to the Final

Leeds Rhinos
Leeds finished top of the table to qualify for a home match in the semi-finals. The play-off structure matched them against the team finishing second - Bradford. Bradford won the semi-final meaning Leeds had to win the elimination final against Wigan to qualify for the grand final. In the elimination final they raced past Wigan 40–12 to set up a rematch against Bradford.

Bradford Bulls
By finishing second in the table Bradford qualified for the semi-finals but had to play the league leaders, Leeds, away with the winners going straight through to the grand final.  In the game at Headingley Bradford won 26–12.

Match details

Bradford's Leon Pryce was unable to play due to a shoulder injury, he was replaced by Paul Johnson.

Andrew Dunemann was left out of the Leeds side. Danny McGuire was partnered by Kevin Sinfield in the halves.
The pre-match entertainment was performed by singer Heather Small

See also
Super League IX

References

External links
2004 Super League Grand Final at rlphotos.com
 - article on Leeds Rhinos including description of 2004 Final

Super League Grand Finals
Bradford Bulls matches
Leeds Rhinos matches
Grand Final